The Tuaran River is a river in West Coast Division, northwestern Sabah of Malaysia.

History 
The small town of Tuaran owes its existence to the river after which it was named. The river is also part of the route where British colonial administrator Hugh Low began his journey for the first recorded ascention of North Borneo's highest point of Mount Kinabalu, having depart from Labuan in 1851.

Conservation efforts 
Much of the river is covered by mangrove palm and swamps that providing natural coastal protection and habitat for several bird species. It is home to saltwater crocodiles (Crocodylus porosus) and notable for many crocodile incidents. Since the 2000s, the coasts of the river was affected by sand mining activities with 14 identified locations. Beginning in the 2010s, the Sabah government through the Lands and Surveys Department (LSD) began to increase operation against illegal sand mining in Tuaran as well on Papar River.

Features 
The river is the freshwater fish source for the villagers and the source of water for their agriculture activities.

See also 
 List of rivers of Malaysia

References

Further reading

External links 
 

Rivers of Sabah
Nature sites of Malaysia
Rivers of Malaysia